"When a Heart Beats" is a song by English singer-songwriter Nik Kershaw, released as the lead single from his third studio album, Radio Musicola (1986)—although the song does not appear on the LP version of the album, only on the cassette and CD editions. Kershaw's eighth single overall, it features the track "Wild Horses"—which was originally included on his previous album, The Riddle (1984)—as its B-side.

Background
Though it reached number 27 on the UK Singles Chart towards the end of 1985, "When a Heart Beats" marked the beginning of a downturn of Kershaw's fortunes on the singles charts, as it was the first time that a lead single from a Kershaw album failed to reach the top 20 in the UK; it also proved to be his last top-40 entry in the UK.

Track listings
7-inch single (MCA NIK 9)
A. "When a Heart Beats" - 4:20
B. "Wild Horses" - 3:50

12-inch single (MCA NIKT 9)
A. "When a Heart Beats" (Extended Mix) - 6:21
B. "Wild Horses" (Extended Mix) - 6:48

Charts

References

External links
 

1985 singles
1985 songs
MCA Records singles
Nik Kershaw songs
Songs written by Nik Kershaw